David Lee Jr. (January 4, 1941 – August 4, 2021) was an American jazz drummer and composer.

Early life
Lee was born in New Orleans on January 4, 1941. He played professionally from his early teens, and was a member of bands in the United States Army.

Career 
In 1969, Lee co-founded the New Orleans Jazz Workshop. Dizzy Gillespie brought Lee into his band in 1969; soon after he worked with Roy Ayers (1971) and Sonny Rollins (1972–1975). Lee then formed a quartet and continued to work as a sideman.

Ethan Iverson wrote that Lee in recordings by Rollins in the 1970s was "swinging hard in a traditional manner but also perfect for all the varied grooves embraced by '70's jazz".

Personal life 
He died on August 4, 2021.

Discography

As sideman
With Yoshiaki Masuo
111 Sullivan St. (1975)
With Sonny Rollins
Next Album (Milestone, 1972)
Horn Culture (Milestone, 1973)
Sonny Rollins in Japan (Victor, 1973)
The Cutting Edge (Milestone, 1974)
First Moves (Jazz Door, 1974)
With Charlie Rouse
Two Is One (1974)
With Lonnie Liston Smith
Astral Traveling (Flying Dutchman, 1973)
With Richard Wyands
Then, Here, and Now (Jazzcraft, 1978)

References

1941 births
2021 deaths
American jazz drummers
American male jazz composers
American jazz composers
Jazz musicians from New Orleans
20th-century American drummers
American male drummers
20th-century American male musicians